is a Japanese animation studio established in 2012.

Works

Television series

Films

References

External links
Official website 

 
Animation studios in Tokyo
Mass media companies established in 2012
Japanese companies established in 2012
Film production companies of Japan
Japanese animation studios
Suginami